Rhectosemia viriditincta is a moth in the family Crambidae. It was described by Eugene G. Munroe in 1959. It is found in Santa Catarina, Brazil and Costa Rica.

References

Spilomelinae
Moths described in 1959